Wilbur McCullough Fisher (July 18, 1894 – October 24, 1960) was an American pinch hitter in Major League Baseball. He played for the Pittsburgh Pirates in 1916.

References

External links

1894 births
1960 deaths
Baseball players from West Virginia
Huntington Blue Sox players
Marshall Thundering Herd baseball players
People from Welch, West Virginia
Petersburg Goobers players
Pittsburgh Pirates players